North Adams Regional Hospital was a full-service community hospital in North Adams, Massachusetts. It served the Northern Berkshire communities of Adams, Cheshire, Clarksburg, Florida, Lanesborough, North Adams, Savoy, Williamstown and communities in southern Vermont and in eastern New York state. The hospital was part of Northern Berkshire Healthcare (NBH), a not-for-profit organization. NBH closed it on March 28, 2014.

The facility was re-opened as a part of Berkshire Health Systems under the name: Berkshire Health North, the facility includes 24 hour Emergency Care, Primary and Specialty Care, Labs and Imaging as well as Community Health programs.

History
The hospital opened March 2, 1884 and the original building was expanded over time. A completely new hospital building on the same campus opened in 1955.

In the 1980s the North Adams Hospital (now known as the North Adams Regional Hospital or NARH) was quite full. However, better medications and treatments for chronic illnesses such as heart disease, diabetes and asthma reduced the need for inpatient hospitalizations and many surgical procedures which had once occurred in the inpatient setting shifted to outpatient facilities.

Beset by chronically low inpatient censuses in recent years, declining reimbursement from Medicaid and Medicare, and facing rising costs, many rural hospitals, not just NARH, struggled to stay alive. Some turned to larger health systems for financial backing, partnership, or mergers.

NARH went through Chapter 11 bankruptcy reorganization in 2011 and built an affiliation with Berkshire Medical Center (BMC) in Pittsfield, MA. They did not merge however, due to NARH's bond debt and existing union contracts.  After closing its doors in March 2014, NARH declared Chapter 7 bankruptcy on April 3, 2014, at which point BMC committed to purchase the facility through the bankruptcy process. During the interim BMC re-established emergency medical care and other medical services in northern Berkshire County.

BMC paid a total  $3.4 million for the hospital campus and NBH's fixed assets, and $600,000 for the Northern Berkshire Family Practice. The purchase was finalized in bankruptcy court on August 29, 2014.

References

External links
 Northern Berkshire Healthcare ( A legacy website for the old North Bershire Healthcare organization )
Berkshire Health North ( The current webpage for Berkshire Healthcare's services in Northern Berkshire County)

Defunct hospitals in Massachusetts
Hospitals established in 1884
1884 establishments in Massachusetts
North Adams, Massachusetts
2014 disestablishments in Massachusetts
Hospitals disestablished in 2014